is a Japanese actress and voice actress.

Filmography

Anime television series
Overman King Gainer (xxxx) (Adette Kistler)
Kino's Journey (xxxx) (Miss Rose)
Tatakau Shisho (xxxx) (Panyi)
Darker than Black: Ryūsei no Gemini (xxxx) (Michiru)
Naruto Shippuden (xxxx) (Former Leader of Nadeshiko Village
Cobra (2010) (Midora)
Star Twinkle PreCure (2019) (Capricorn's Star Princess)
Blade of the Immortal -Immortal- (2019) (Hyakurin)

Theatrical animation
Naruto the Movie 3: Guardians of the Crescent Moon Kingdom (2006) (Amayo)

Video games
The Wonderful 101 (2013) (Vijounne)
Need for Speed Payback (2017) (Lina Navarro)
Resident Evil 2 (2019) (Annette Birkin)
Resident Evil 3 (2020) (Annette Birkin)

Dubbing roles

Live-action
Kate Winslet
Eternal Sunshine of the Spotless Mind (Clementine Kruczynski)
The Holiday (Iris Simpkins)
Revolutionary Road (April Wheeler)
Contagion (Dr. Erin Mears)
A Little Chaos (Sabine De Barra)
Steve Jobs (Joanna Hoffman)
Black Beauty (Black Beauty)
2012 (Kate Curtis (Amanda Peet))
24 (Chloe O'Brian (Mary Lynn Rajskub))
Absentia (Emily Byrne (Stana Katic))
Agatha Christie's Poirot (Rosamund (Fiona Glascott))
Agents of S.H.I.E.L.D. (Barbara "Bobbi" Morse (Adrianne Palicki))
All or Nothing (Rachel)
Another Earth (Rhoda Williams (Brit Marling))
Assassin's Creed (Dr. Sofia Rikkin (Marion Cotillard))
Bad Lieutenant: Port of Call New Orleans (Frankie Donnenfeld (Eva Mendes))
Battlestar Galactica (Sharon Valerii "Boomer" Ensign (Grace Park))
Before the Devil Knows You're Dead (Gina Hanson (Marisa Tomei))
Black Panther: Wakanda Forever (Dr. Graham (Lake Bell))
Blindspot (Natasha Zapata (Audrey Esparza))
Bones (Joy Deaver (Alicia Coppola) & Helen)
Che (Tamara Bunke (Franka Potente))
Chicago Joe and the Showgirl (2009 DVD edition) (Betty Jones (Emily Lloyd))
Chocolate (Zin)
The Chorus (Violette Morhange (Marie Bunel))
Clash of the Titans (Princess Andromeda (Alexa Davalos))
Criminal Minds (Jordan Todd (Meta Golding) and Kate Callahan (Jennifer Love Hewitt))
Dawn of the Dead (2010 DVD edition) (Francine "Flygirl" Parker (Gaylen Ross))
Deadpool (Vanessa (Morena Baccarin)
Deadpool 2 (Vanessa (Morena Baccarin))
The Devil's Double (Sarrab (Ludivine Sagnier))
Enchanted (Nancy Tremaine (Idina Menzel))
End of Days (2001 TV Asahi edition) (Christine York (Robin Tunney))
ER (Hope (Busy Philipps))
Eragon (Saphira (Rachel Weisz))
Farewell, My Queen (Marie Antoinette (Diane Kruger))
Fast & Furious (2011 TV Asahi edition) (Sophie Trinh (Liza Lapira))
Final Destination 3 (Wendy Christensen (Mary Elizabeth Winstead))
Firewall (2009 TV Asahi edition) (Janet Stone (Mary Lynn Rajskub))
FlashForward (Olivia Benford (Sonya Walger))
Flying Swords of Dragon Gate (Gu Shaotang (Li Yuchun))
From Russia with Love (Tatiana Romanova (Daniela Bianchi))
Get Smart (Agent 99 (Anne Hathaway))
Gold (Kay (Bryce Dallas Howard))
Gossip Girl (Juliet Sharp (Katie Cassidy))
The Green Hornet (Lenore Case (Cameron Diaz))
Greenland (Allison Garrity (Morena Baccarin))
Grey's Anatomy (Violet Turner (Amy Brenneman))
Hercules (Atalanta (Ingrid Bolsø Berdal))
He's Just Not That Into You (Janine Gunders (Jennifer Connelly))
His Dark Materials (Serafina Pekkala (Ruta Gedmintas))
Homefront (Cassie Bodine Klum (Kate Bosworth))
The Hospital (Ju Hoiin)
Hostiles (Rosalee Quaid (Rosamund Pike))
I Come with the Rain (Lili (Trần Nữ Yên Khê))
I Hate Suzie (Naomi Jones (Leila Farzad))
Igby Goes Down (Sookie Sapperstein (Claire Danes))
Jack Reacher (Helen Rodin (Rosamund Pike))
John Carter (Dejah Thoris (Lynn Collins))
Kiss of Death (Jude Whiley (Lenora Crichlow))
The Last King of Scotland (Kay Amin (Kerry Washington))
The Last Stand (Deputy Sarah Torrance (Jaimie Alexander))
The Martian (Melissa Lewis (Jessica Chastain))
Merlin (Gwen (Angel Coulby))
Mother's Day (Jesse (Kate Hudson))
Mr. Mercedes (Cora Babineau (Tessa Ferrer))
My Lovely Sam Soon (Kim Sam-soon (Kim Sun-a))
Obsessed (Sharon Charles (Beyoncé Knowles))
The Pacific (Sgt Lena Mae Riggi Basilone (Annie Parisse))
Pepper Dennis (Kimmy Kim (Lindsay Price))
Perfect Sense (Susan (Eva Green))
Private Practice (Violet Turner (Amy Brenneman))
Proof (Catherine Llewellyn (Gwyneth Paltrow))
The Punisher (Livia Saint (Laura Harring))
Resident Evil: Extinction (2010 TV Asahi edition) (Claire Redfield (Ali Larter))
Sabotage (Lizzy Murray (Mireille Enos))
The Secret Life of Bees (May Boatwright (Sophie Okonedo))
Sense8 (Lila Facchini (Valeria Bilello))
Sisters (Kate Ellis (Tina Fey))
Snow White and the Huntsman (Queen Eleanor (Liberty Ross))
So Little Time (Tedi (Natashia Williams))
Speed Racer (Horuko Togokahn (Yu Nan))
The Strangers (Kristen McKay (Liv Tyler))
Terminator 3: Rise of the Machines (Kate Brewster (Claire Danes))
Terminator Salvation (Kate Connor (Bryce Dallas Howard))
Terminator: The Sarah Connor Chronicles (Riley Dawson (Leven Rambin))
Transformers (Maggie Madsen (Rachael Taylor))
Transformers: Age of Extinction (Darcy Tyril (Sophia Myles))
Ugly Betty (Sofia Reyes (Salma Hayek))
Wander (Elsa Viceroy (Katheryn Winnick))
The West Wing (Joey Lucas (Marlee Matlin))
What to Expect When You're Expecting (Jules Baxter (Cameron Diaz))
Wind Chill (Girl (Emily Blunt))
Winter Sonata  (2004) (Oh Chae-rin (Park Sol-mi))
The World's End (Sam Chamberlain (Rosamund Pike))
Wrath of the Titans (Andromeda (Rosamund Pike))

Animation
Onward (Dewdrop)
Open Season 3 (Ursa)
Sinbad: Legend of the Seven Seas (Lady Marina)
Monster Hunter: Legends of the Guild (Nadia)

References

External links
 Agency profile 

 Marika Hayashi at GamePlaza-Haruka Voice Acting Database 

1975 births
Living people
Japanese stage actresses
Japanese video game actresses
Japanese voice actresses
Voice actresses from Kanagawa Prefecture
20th-century Japanese actresses
21st-century Japanese actresses